Balaji Devidasrao Kalyankar  is a Shiv Sena politician from Nanded district, Maharashtra, India. He is current Member of Legislative Assembly from Nanded North Vidhan Sabha constituency as a member of Shiv Sena.

Positions held
 2017: Corporator, Nanded-Waghala Municipal Corporation
 2019: MLA, Nanded (North).

References

External links
 Shivsena Home Page 

Shiv Sena politicians
Living people
Year of birth missing (living people)

Maharashtra MLAs 2019–2024